Othello (full title: The Tragedy of Othello, the Moor of Venice) is a tragic play by William Shakespeare, believed to have been written in 1603. 

Othello or Otello may also refer to:

People with the name
 Othello Henderson (born 1972), American football player
Othello Hunter (born 1986), American-Liberian basketball player in the Israeli Basketball Premier League
 Otello Profazio (born 1934), Italian cantastorie and folk singer-songwriter

Places

Geography
 Othello, New Jersey, an unincorporated community
 Othello, Washington, a U.S. city

Buildings and structures
 Othello Air Force Station, a closed United States Air Force near Othello, Washington
 Othello Castle, Cyprus
 Othello High School,  Othello, Washington
 Othello station, a Link light rail station in Seattle, Washington
 Othello Tunnels, rail tunnels (and nickname) of Coquihalla Canyon Provincial Park, British Columbia, Canada

Arts, entertainment, and media

Films
Otello (1906 film), an Italian silent film
Othello (1922 film), a film starring Emil Jannings
Othello (1951 film), a film starring Orson Welles
Othello (1956 film), a Soviet film by Sergei Yutkevich
Othello (1965 Australian film), a telefilm broadcast on the ABC as part of Wednesday Theatre 
Othello (1965 British film), a film starring Laurence Olivier and Maggie Smith
Othello (1980 film), a film starring Yaphet Kotto
Othello (1981 TV film), a TV adaptation starring Anthony Pedley and Anthony Hopkins
The Tragedy of Othello, the Moor of Venice, a 1981 film starring William Marshall and Ron Moody
Otello (1986 film), a film by Franco Zeffirelli
Othello (1990 film), a film starring Willard White and Ian McKellen
Othello (1995 film), a film starring Laurence Fishburne and Kenneth Branagh
Othello (2001 film), a made-for-television film starring Keeley Hawes and Eamonn Walker
 Othello (2017 film), an Assamese language drama film

Gaming
 Reversi, a board game better known as Othello 
 Othello (2009 video game)
 Othello (video game), a 1988 NES game
 Computer Othello,  computer architecture encompassing computer hardware and computer software capable of playing the game Othello
 Othello Quarterly, a U.S. magazine for the board game
 Othello Multivision, a cartridge-based video game console and Sega SG-1000 clone

Manga
 Othello (Satomi Ikezawa manga), a 2001–2004 shoujo manga
 Othello (Toui Hasumi manga), a 2007 manga

Music
Otello (Rossini), an 1816 opera by Gioachino  Rossini
Otello, an 1887 opera by Giuseppe Verdi
Othello (Dvořák), an 1892 concert overture by Antonín Dvořák

Other uses in arts, entertainment, and media
Othello (ballet), a ballet by Lar Lubovitch
 Othello (character), the protagonist of Shakespeare's 1603 play and Cinthio's story
Othello (Orson Welles stage production) (1951)
 Othello (owarai), a Japanese comedy duo
 Othello (paintings), a series of paintings by Nabil Kanso
"Un Capitano Moro" (English translation: "A Moorish Captain"), a story by Cinthio, first published in 1565, which Shakespeare adapted as a 1603 play

Brands and enterprises
 Otello Corporation, a Norwegian Internet company, formerly known as Opera Software ASA.

Ships
 Othello (1781 ship) or Ortello, a slave ship
 Othello (1786 ship), a slave ship
 List of ships named Othello

See also
O (film), a 2001 modern film by Tim Blake Nelson, adapted from Shakespeare's Othello
Omkara (film), a 2006 Indian film adapted from Shakespeare's Othello